Frederick III of Baden (1327 – 2 September 1353) was Margrave of Baden from 1348 to 1353.

Life
He was the elder son of Rudolf IV and Marie of Oettingen.

Family and children
He married Margareta of Baden, daughter of Rudolf Hesso, Margrave of Baden-Baden and had the following children:
 Rudolf VI, Margrave of Baden-Baden (died 21 March 1372).
 Margarete, Dame d'Héricourt, married to:
 10 November 1363 Count Gottfried II of Leiningen-Rixingen;
 Count Heinrich of Lützelstein.

See also
List of rulers of Baden

References

Margraves of Baden-Baden
1327 births
1353 deaths